Melville Bernd Kaufman (Newark, New Jersey, April 23, 1879 - New York City, February 21, 1932) was a prolific American ragtime piano composer  Mel B. Kaufman was born in Newark, New Jersey, on April 23, 1879. He was a composer of popular songs and instrumental music from 1912 to 1932.

Among his best known works were "Me-Ow", "More Candy", "Taxi", "Step With Pep" and "Pick A Chicken".

References

External links
 

1879 births
1932 deaths
American male composers
American composers
Musicians from Newark, New Jersey